Palanzano is a comune (municipality) in the Province of Parma in the Italian region Emilia-Romagna, located about  west of Bologna and about  south of Parma.   
Palanzano borders the following municipalities: Corniglio, Monchio delle Corti, Neviano degli Arduini,   Tizzano Val Parma, Ventasso, Vetto.

References

Cities and towns in Emilia-Romagna